HD 189733 b is an exoplanet approximately  away from the Solar System in the constellation of Vulpecula. Astronomers in France discovered the planet orbiting the star HD 189733 on October 5, 2005, by observing its transit across the star's face.

The closest transiting hot Jupiter to Earth, HD 189733 b is a subject of extensive atmospheric examination.
Accordingly, scientists have extensively studied the exoplanet's atmosphere with high- and low-resolution instruments, both from the ground and space. Researchers have found that the planet has an unusual rain of molten glass.
HD 188733 b was also the first exoplanet to have its thermal map constructed (possibly to be detected through polarimetry), its overall color determined (deep blue), transit in the X-ray spectrum, and carbon dioxide confirmed in its atmosphere.

In July 2014, NASA announced finding very dry atmospheres on three exoplanets (HD 189733b, HD 209458b, WASP-12b) orbiting Sun-like stars.

Detection and discovery

Transit and Doppler spectroscopy 

On October 6, 2005, a team of astronomers announced the discovery of transiting planet HD 189733 b. The planet was then detected using Doppler spectroscopy. Real-time radial velocity measurements detected the Rossiter–McLaughlin effect caused by the planet passing in front of its star before photometric measurements confirmed that the planet was transiting. In 2006, a team led by Drake Deming announced detection of strong infrared thermal emission from the transiting exoplanet planet HD 189733 b, by measuring the flux decrement (decrease of total light) during its prominent secondary eclipse (when the planet passes behind the star).

Infrared spectrum 
On February 21, 2007, NASA released news that the Spitzer Space Telescope had measured detailed spectra from both HD 189733 b and HD 209458 b. The release came simultaneously with the public release of a new issue of Nature containing the first publication on the spectroscopic observation of the other exoplanet, HD 209458 b. A paper was submitted and published by the Astrophysical Journal Letters. The spectroscopic observations of HD 189733 b were led by Carl Grillmair of NASA's Spitzer Science Center.

Visible color 
In 2008, a team of astrophysicists appeared to have detected and monitored the planet's visible light using polarimetry, which would have been the first such success. This result seemed to be confirmed and refined by the same team in 2011. They found that the planet albedo is significantly larger in blue light than in the red, most probably due to Rayleigh scattering and molecular absorption in the red. The blue color of the planet was subsequently confirmed in 2013, which would have made HD 189733 the first planet to have its overall color determined by two different techniques. These measurements in polarized light have since been disputed by two separate teams using more sensitive polarimeters, with upper limits of the polarimetric signal provided therein.

The blueness of the planet may be the result of Rayleigh scattering. In mid January 2008, spectral observation during the planet's transit using that model found that if molecular hydrogen exists, it would have an atmospheric pressure of 410 ± 30 mbar of 0.1564 solar radii. The Mie approximation model also found that there is a possible condensate in its atmosphere, magnesium silicate (MgSiO3) with a particle size of approximately 10−2 to 10−1 μm. Using both models, the planet's temperature would be between 1340 and 1540 K. The Rayleigh effect is confirmed in other models, and by the apparent lack of a cooler, shaded stratosphere below its outer atmosphere. In the visible region of the spectrum, thanks to their high absorption cross sections, atomic sodium and potassium can be investigated. For example, using high-resolution UVES spectrograph on VLT, sodium has been detected on this atmosphere and further physical characteristics of the atmosphere such as temperature has been investigated.

X-ray spectrum 
In July 2013, NASA reported the first observations of planet transit studied in the X-ray spectrum. It was found that the planet's atmosphere blocks three times more X-rays than visible light.

Evaporation 

In March 2010, transit observations using HI Lyman-alpha found that this planet is evaporating at a rate of 1-100 gigagrams per second. This indication was found by detecting the extended exosphere of atomic hydrogen. HD 189733 b is the second planet after HD 209458 b for which atmospheric evaporation has been detected.

Physical characteristics 
This planet exhibits one of the largest photometric transit depth (amount of the parent star's light blocked) of extrasolar planets so far observed, approximately 3%. The apparent longitude of ascending node of its orbit is 16 degrees +/- 8 away from the north–south in our sky. It and HD 209458 b were the first two planets to be directly spectroscopically observed. The parent stars of these two planets are the brightest transiting-planet host stars, so these planets will continue to receive the most attention from astronomers. Like most hot Jupiters, this planet is thought to be tidally locked to its parent star, meaning it has a permanent day and night.

The planet is not oblate, and has neither satellites with greater than 0.8 the radius of Earth nor a ring system like that of Saturn.

The international team under the direction of Svetlana Berdyugina of Zurich University of Technology, using the Swedish 60-centimeter telescope KVA, which is located in Spain, was able to directly see the polarized light reflected from the planet. The polarization indicates that the scattering atmosphere is considerably larger (> 30%) than the opaque body of the planet seen during transits.

The atmosphere was at first predicted "pL class", lacking a temperature-inversion stratosphere; like L dwarfs which lack titanium and vanadium oxides. Follow-up measurements, tested against a stratospheric model, yielded inconclusive results. A sunset viewed from that surface would be red. Sodium and potassium signals were predicted by Tinetti 2007. First obscured by the haze of condensates, sodium was eventually observed at three times the concentration of HD 209458 b's sodium layer. The potassium was also detected in 2020, although in significantly smaller concentrations. HD 189733 is also the first extrasolar planet confirmed to have carbon dioxide in its atmosphere.

Map of the planet 

In 2007, the Spitzer Space Telescope was used to map the planet's temperature emissions. The planet+star system was observed for 33 consecutive hours, starting when only the night side of the planet was in view. Over the course of one-half of the planet's orbit, more and more of the dayside came into view. A temperature range of 973 ± 33 K to 1,212 ± 11 K was discovered, indicating that the absorbed energy from the parent star is distributed fairly evenly through the planet's atmosphere. The region of peak temperature was offset 30 degrees east of the substellar point, as predicted by theoretical models of hot Jupiters taking into account a parameterized day to night redistribution mechanism.

Scientists at the University of Warwick determined that it has winds of up to  blowing from the day side to the night side. NASA released a brightness map of the surface temperature of HD 189733 b; it is the first map ever published of an extra-solar planet.

Water vapor, oxygen, and organic compounds 
On July 11, 2007, a team led by Giovanna Tinetti published the results of their observations using the Spitzer Space Telescope concluding there is solid evidence for significant amounts of water vapor in the planet's atmosphere. Follow-up observations made using the Hubble Space Telescope confirm the presence of water vapor, neutral oxygen and also the organic compound methane. Later, Very Large Telescope observations also detected the presence of carbon monoxide on the day side of the planet. It is currently unknown how the methane originated as the planet's high  temperature should cause the water and methane to react, replacing the atmosphere with carbon monoxide. Nonetheless, the presence of roughly 0.004% of water vapour fraction by volume in atmosphere of HD 189733 b was confirmed with high-resolution emission spectra taken in 2021.

Weather and rains of molten glass 

The weather on HD 189733b is deadly. Observations of this planet have also found evidence that it rains molten glass, horizontally.

Evolution 
While transiting the system also clearly exhibits the Rossiter–McLaughlin effect, shifting in photospheric spectral lines caused by the planet occulting a part of the rotating stellar surface. Due to its high mass and close orbit, the parent star has a very large semi-amplitude (K), the "wobble" in the star's radial velocity, of 205 m/s.

The Rossiter–McLaughlin effect allows the measurement of the angle between the planet's orbital plane and the equatorial plane of the star. These are well aligned, misalignment equal to -0.5°. By analogy with HD 149026 b, the formation of the planet was peaceful and probably involved interactions with the protoplanetary disc. A much larger angle would have suggested a violent interplay with other protoplanets.

Star-planet interaction controversy 
In 2008, a team of astronomers first described how as the exoplanet orbiting HD 189733 A reaches a certain place in its orbit, it causes increased stellar flaring. In 2010, a different team found that every time they observe the exoplanet at a certain position in its orbit, they also detected X-ray flares. Theoretical research since 2000 suggested that an exoplanet very near to the star that it orbits may cause increased flaring due to the interaction of their magnetic fields, or because of tidal forces. In 2019, astronomers analyzed data from Arecibo Observatory, MOST, and the Automated Photoelectric Telescope, in addition to historical observations of the star at radio, optical, ultraviolet, and X-ray wavelengths to examine these claims. They found that the previous claims were exaggerated and the host star failed to display many of the brightness and spectral characteristics associated with stellar flaring and solar active regions, including sunspots. Their statistical analysis also found that many stellar flares are seen regardless of the position of the exoplanet, therefore debunking the earlier claims. The magnetic fields of the host star and exoplanet do not interact, and this system is no longer believed to have a "star-planet interaction." Some researchers had also suggested that HD 189733 accretes, or pulls, gas from its orbiting exoplanet at a rate similar to those found around young protostars in T Tauri Star systems. Later analysis demonstrated that very little, if any, gas was accreted from the "hot Jupiter" companion.

See also 

 Dimidium "Bellerophon" (51 Pegasi b - HD 217014 b)
 HD 2039 b
 HD 149026 b
 Kepler-186 f
 Osiris (HD 209458 b)
 WASP-3 b
 WASP-12 b
 WASP-189 b

References

External links 
 
 
 
 
 

Vulpecula
Hot Jupiters
Transiting exoplanets
Exoplanets discovered in 2005
Exoplanets detected by radial velocity
Articles containing video clips

es:HD 189733#HD 189733b